Nasirabad is a district in the centre-west of Balochistan, Pakistan. Nasirabad's headquarters are at Dera Murad Jamali.

The original name of the district was Temple Dera, named after Captain H. M. Temple, a career British civil servant, who served as the Political Agent for Sibi from 1891 to 1892. Among the local population it is still known as 'Tipul', a corruption of the word 'temple'.

Formerly part of Kalat District, Nasirabad was granted the status of a separate district in 1974, while in 1987 the new district of Jaffarabad was cleaved out of it. For three years, from July 1987 to December 1990, it was known as Tahseel Tamboo. Tamboo is a small village 40 km west of Dera Murad Jamali.

Administrative divisions

Tehsils
The district is administratively subdivided into four Tehsils, these are:

 Dera Murad Jamali (district headquarters)
 Chhatter
 Baba Kot
 Tamboo

Union councils
These tehsils are further divided into union councils. Currently, there are 31 union councils and one municipal committee in the district:

Tehsil Dera Murad Jamali

Municipal Committee Dera Murad Jamali
Union Council Quba Sher Khan Sharqi
Union Council Quba Sher Khan Gharbi
Union Council Naseer Khan Umrani
Union Council Jhuder Shimali
Union Council Bedar Androon Sharqi
Union Council Bedar Gharbi
Union Council Manjhoti Sharqi
Union Council Sardar Shahzada Khan Umrani
Union Council Sikandarabad
Union Council Manjhoti Gharbi
Union Council Jhuder Janubi

Tehsil Chhatter

Union Council Chhatter
Union Council Phuleji
Union Council Shah Pur
Union Council Daulat Ghari Mir Nabi Bakhsh Khan
Union Council Daulat Ghari Mir Hassan Khosa
Union Council Shori Drabi

Tehsil Tamboo

Union Council Manjhoo Shoori
Union Council Aeri
Union Council Gola Wah
Union Council Ali Abad Shumali
Union Council Mir Behram Khan Buledi
Union Council Qadir Abad
Union Council Kharoos Wah
Union Council Fateh Mohammad
Union Council Mir Wah
Union Council Abdullah Bari
Union Council Ali Abad

Tehsil Baba Kot
Union Council Garhi Rehman
Union Council Baba Kot
Union Council Kuhna Tamboo

Tehsil Landhi

Demographics

At the time of the 2017 census the district had a population of 487,847, of which 96,316 (19.74%) lived in urban areas. Nasirabad had a sex ratio of 939 females per 1000 males and a literacy rate of 23.30% - 33.22% for males and 12.97% for females. 192,195 (39.40%) were under 10 years of age.

At the time of the 2017 census, 39.05% of the population spoke Balochi, 22.89% Brahui, 21.22% Sindhi and 15.21% Saraiki as their first language.

References

Bibliography

External links

 Nasirabad District at www.balochistan.gov.pk
 Nasirabad District at www.balochistanpolice.gov.pk

 
Districts of Pakistan
Districts of Balochistan, Pakistan